The Santa Clara Relief Society House is a historic house in Santa Clara, Utah. It was built in 1908 for the local chapter of the Relief Society of the Church of Jesus Christ of Latter-day Saints, and it was designed in the Late Victorian style. It has been listed on the National Register of Historic Places since February 2, 1994.

References

	
National Register of Historic Places in Washington County, Utah
Victorian architecture in Utah
Buildings and structures completed in 1908
Relief Society buildings
1908 establishments in Utah
20th-century Latter Day Saint church buildings